The 1972–73 Washington State Cougars men's basketball team represented Washington State University for the 1972–73 NCAA college basketball season. Led by first-year head coach George Raveling, the Cougars were members of the Pacific-8 Conference and played their home games on campus at Bohler Gymnasium in Pullman, Washington.

The two conference wins were both at home: Stanford in early January in Raveling's   and Oregon State  This was the last season for varsity basketball at Bohler Gym; the Performing Arts Center (now Beasley Coliseum) opened in 

Raveling was hired in April 1972; he was previously an assistant at Maryland under Lefty Driesell, and led the Cougar program for eleven seasons.

References

External links
Sports Reference – Washington State Cougars: 1972–73 basketball season

Washington State Cougars men's basketball seasons
Washington State Cougars
Washington State
Washington State